Rahul Suntah (born June 6, 1997) is a Mauritian composer, music producer and pianist currently based in England. Rahul attracted a following on Instagram for his viral piano covers of popular songs and his innovative ways of playing the piano which got him featured on platforms such as BBC and ITV.

Early life 

Suntah is a classically trained pianist who started learning the piano aged 8, at the Frederic Chopin Conservatory of Music situated in his hometown where he studied ABRSM Piano and Music Theory. Suntah got his Bachelor's Degree in Audio and Music Technology from UWE Bristol in 2019 and his Master's Degree in Composition for Film and Television from the University of Bristol in 2021.

Career 

Suntah began composing music at the age of 13. After finishing high school, Suntah decided to pursue his studies in Audio and Music Technology at the University of the West of England in Bristol, graduating in July 2019 with focus in composition, production and sound engineering. During his time at university he was among the winners of the annual UWE Bristol Talent Show in 2019. In February 2020, Suntah independently released his debut EP entitled Piano Stories. In August 2020, Suntah was among the finalists of the Mauritian talent show Zenes Montre To Talan depi Lakaz. In early 2021, Suntah was featured as a spotlight artist on BBC Music Introducing talking about his original composition Paradise Island, and was interviewed for his cover of Queen's Bohemian Rhapsody on BBC Radio Bristol. Suntah has several videos that went viral on Instagram and Facebook such as his piano rendition of Mozart's Rondo Alla Turca. Passionate about cinematography and film music, Suntah pursued a Master's Degree in Film Scoring on scholarship at the University of Bristol, graduating in 2021. His cover of Gorillaz's Feel Good Inc. caught the attention of the popular American viral video show Right This Minute and was featured on BBC Radio Bristol's website in October 2021. His album Cinematic Wonders was released on December 19, 2021 featuring a compilation of original music written for screen media during his time at University. His track Paradise Island was listed among the top tracks of 2021 on BBC Music Introducing in January 2022. Suntah was invited to play at a prestigious concert in Manchester Cathedral in February 2022 and was interviewed by british news programme ITV News about his musical career and his first UK concert. Suntah's cover of I'm So Excited by The Pointer Sisters went viral on Facebook and was used in Maandag'''s TV advert, a Dutch agency promoting new jobs in Amsterdam. Suntah was also invited to star in the commercial in November 2022 directed and produced by The Family Amsterdam, an advertising agency who has worked with the likes of Cara Delevingne and Snoop Dogg and was invited to open for their award show. Suntah was featured as a green room guest on BBC Radio London to chat about his career and perform live on radio. Suntah currently resides in London.

 Musical style and influences 

Rahul has been described as a versatile musician and a piano prodigy known for blending Classical and Electronic music and for reshaping the way the piano is played, using unconventional piano extended techniques and live loop setups with a Novation Launchpad while also incorporating a wide range of other musical genres such as Jazz, Rock, Pop, R&B and EDM. Rahul cites many artists that influenced and inspired him such as Beethoven, Mozart, Chopin, Hans Zimmer, John Williams, Charlie Puth, Jacob Collier, Jamie Cullum, Daft Punk, Michael Jackson, Queen, Peter Bence, The Piano Guys and many more.

 Discography 

 Published Sheet Music 

 Paradise Island, Rahul Suntah
 Space Wander, Rahul Suntah
 Home Bound, Rahul Suntah
 Fly me to the Moon, Frank Sinatra
 Blinding Lights, The Weeknd
 Underdog, Alicia Keys
 She Will Be Loved, Maroon 5
 Shape of You, Ed Sheeran
 Despacito, Luis Fonsi & Daddy Yankee
 Échame la Culpa, Luis Fonsi & Demi Lovato
 The Avengers, Alan Silvestri
 Señorita, Shawn Mendes & Camila Cabello
 Another One Bites the Dust'', Queen.

Awards

References

External links 
 Official Website
 Rahul Suntah on YouTube
 Rahul Suntah on Instagram
 Rahul Suntah on BBC
 Rahul Suntah on Musicnotes

1997 births
Male classical pianists
Mauritian composers
Mauritian musicians
British composers
British classical pianists
British male musicians
Male composers
Male musicians
21st-century pianists
21st-century British male musicians
Living people